Landers may refer to:

People 
 Landers (surname), a list of people surnamed Landers (including fictional people)

Places 
 Landers, California, United States
 Landers Peaks, group of peaks in the northern portion of Alexander Island, Antarctica
 Landers Shoot, Queensland, Australia

Other uses 
 Lander's Horseshoe Bat (Rhinolophus landeri), a species of bat in the family Rhinolophidae
 Ask Ann Landers, a popular advice column in the Chicago Sun-Times
 1992 Landers earthquake, an earthquake centered in California
 Lander's Center, a multipurpose arena in Southaven, Mississippi
 Landers, Frary & Clark, a housewares company based in New Britain, Connecticut
 Landers Theatre, a civic theater in Springfield, Missouri
 Little Landers, a term that refers to early settlers in parts of California

See also 
 Lander (disambiguation)
 Länder
 Flatlander (disambiguation)
 Outlander (disambiguation)